The 1991 Air Force Falcons football team represented the United States Air Force Academy in the 1991 NCAA Division I-A football season. In the Ram–Falcon Trophy match, the Falcons beat the Colorado State Rams to win the trophy.

Schedule

Personnel

Team players in the NFL
The following were selected in the 1992 NFL Draft.

Awards and honors
 Kette Dornbush, Bullard Award

References

Air Force
Air Force Falcons football seasons
Liberty Bowl champion seasons
Air Force Falcons football